Mary Diane Denny is an American retired politician.

Denny was elected to the Texas House of Representatives from District 63 between 1993 and 2007 as a Republican. During her tenure as a state legislator, Denny lived in Aubrey, Texas.

References

21st-century American politicians
21st-century American women politicians
Republican Party members of the Texas House of Representatives
Living people
Year of birth missing (living people)
Women state legislators in Texas
20th-century American women politicians
20th-century American politicians
People from Denton County, Texas